Bernadette Coston (born 17 August 1989, Johannesburg) is a South African field hockey player. At the 2012 Summer Olympics she competed with the South Africa women's national field hockey team in the women's tournament.  She was also part of the South African women's team at the 2014 Commonwealth Games.

She completed her Master’s degree in Chiropractic and graduated from the University of Johannesburg in 2016.

She has announced her retirement from International Hockey.

References

External links 
 

 Bernadette Coston - Varsity Sports Profile

Living people
1989 births
South African people of British descent
Olympic field hockey players of South Africa
South African female field hockey players
Field hockey players at the 2012 Summer Olympics
People from Johannesburg
Field hockey players at the 2014 Commonwealth Games
Commonwealth Games competitors for South Africa
University of Johannesburg alumni
Crusaders Hockey Club players
20th-century South African women
21st-century South African women
Field hockey players at the 2022 Commonwealth Games